Maxwell Grant (20 January 1960 – 7 August 2012), better known as Ranking Trevor and sometimes as Ranking Superstar, was a Jamaican reggae deejay.

Biography
Grant began deejaying as a teenager in the 1970s, and began his recording career at the age of fifteen. Regarded as a follower of U-Roy, Grant recorded at Channel One as Ranking Trevor in the mid-1970s, his first release being "Natty a Roots Man", and deejayed on the Socialist Roots sound system. He had success in 1977 with singles such as "Cave Man Skank" and "Three Piece Chicken and Chips" (a response to Trinity's "Three Piece Suit"), which were popular among British reggae fans, and these were followed by further hits on the British reggae charts in 1978 with "Pure & Clean" and "Rub a Dub Style", and he signed a record deal with Virgin Records' reggae label, Front Line, who released his debut album, In Fine Style. Joseph Hoo Kim followed this by releasing the Three Piece Chicken and Chips album, compiling tracks by Trevor and Trinity. In 1979 he recorded the Repatriation Time album with producer Linval Thompson, which was released the following year. He went on to work with Sugar Minott on the album Presenting Ranking Trevor, released in 1981 on Minott's Black Roots label. Continuing popularity in the UK prompted his relocation to London in the mid-1980s, where he lived for more than twenty years before returning to Jamaica.

He died on 7 August 2012 from injuries sustained from a collision while riding his motorcycle in Kingston.

Discography

Albums
In Fine Style (1978), Front Line
Three Piece Chicken and Chips (1978), Cha Cha
Repatriation Time (1980), Lord Koos - credited as Ranking Superstar
Presenting Ranking Trevor (1981), Black Roots

Compilations
Roots of all Roots (198?), Micron - Ranking Trevor and Friends

References

1960 births
2012 deaths
musicians from Kingston, Jamaica
Jamaican reggae musicians